Elaphromyia pterocallaeformis is a species of tephritid or fruit flies in the genus Elaphromyia of the family Tephritidae.

Distribution
Yemen, India, Philippines.

References

Tephritinae
Insects described in 1913
Taxa named by Mario Bezzi
Diptera of Asia